Karina Sydorak (born 25 June 2005) is a Ukrainian female rhythmic gymnast. She is the 2020 Junior European champion with Ball.

Career

Junior
She won bronze medal in Team competition at the 2020 Deriugina Cup. She competed at the 2020 Junior European Championships and won gold medal in Team competition. She also qualified to Ribbon final and won another gold medal. In 2021, she joined national junior group that competed at international competitions. They took 6th place in Group All-around at the 2021 European Championships in Varna, Bulgaria and advanced in both Apparatus finals, where they placed 5th.

References

External links 
 
 

2006 births
Living people
Ukrainian rhythmic gymnasts
Sportspeople from Lviv
21st-century Ukrainian women